{{DISPLAYTITLE:Q10 (temperature coefficient)}}

The Q10 temperature coefficient is a measure of temperature sensitivity based on the chemical reactions.

The Q10 is calculated as:

 

where;  
 R is the rate
 T is the temperature in Celsius degrees or kelvin.

Rewriting this equation, the assumption behind Q10 is that the reaction rate R depends exponentially on temperature:

 

Q10 is a unitless quantity, as it is the factor by which a rate changes, and is a useful way to express the temperature dependence of a process.

For most biological systems, the Q10 value is ~ 2 to 3.

In muscle performance

The temperature of a muscle has a significant effect on the velocity and power of the muscle contraction, with performance generally declining with decreasing temperatures and increasing with rising temperatures. The Q10 coefficient represents the degree of temperature dependence a muscle exhibits as measured by contraction rates. A Q10 of 1.0 indicates thermal independence of a muscle whereas an increasing Q10 value indicates increasing thermal dependence. Values less than 1.0 indicate a negative or inverse thermal dependence, i.e., a decrease in muscle performance as temperature increases.

Q10 values for biological processes vary with temperature. Decreasing muscle temperature results in a substantial decline of muscle performance such that a 10 degree Celsius temperature decrease results in at least a 50% decline in muscle performance. Persons who have fallen into icy water may gradually lose the ability to swim or grasp safety lines due to this effect, although other effects such as atrial fibrillation are a more immediate cause of drowning deaths. At some minimum temperature biological systems do not function at all, but performance increases with rising temperature (Q10 of 2-4) to a maximum performance level and thermal independence (Q10 of 1.0-1.5). With continued increase in temperature, performance decreases rapidly (Q10 of 0.2-0.8) up to a maximum temperature at which all biological function again ceases.

Within vertebrates, different skeletal muscle activity has correspondingly different thermal dependencies. The rate of muscle twitch contractions and relaxations are thermally dependent (Q10 of 2.0-2.5), whereas maximum contraction, e.g., tetanic contraction, is thermally independent.

Muscles of some ectothermic species. e.g., sharks, show less thermal dependence at lower temperatures than endothermic species

See also 
 Arrhenius equation
 Arrhenius plot
 Isotonic (exercise physiology)
 Isometric exercise
 Skeletal striated muscle
 Tetanic contraction

References 

Ecological metrics
Chemical kinetics